Emanuel United Church of Christ may refer to;

Emanuel United Church of Christ (Manchester, Michigan), listed as a Michigan State Historic Site
Church whose Emanuel United Church of Christ Cemetery, in Thomasville, North Carolina, is listed on the National Register of Historic Places (NRHP)
Emanuel United Church of Christ (Lincolnton, North Carolina), NRHP-listed